Steffen Thier (born 25 November 1980) is a German international rugby union player, playing for the RG Heidelberg in the Rugby-Bundesliga and the German national rugby union team.

He played his last game for Germany on 24 November 2007 against Moldova.

He has played rugby since 1994.

In the past, he captained the German sevens side.

Honours

Club
 German rugby union championship
 Champions: 2006, 2007
 German rugby union cup
 Winners: 2004

National team
 European Nations Cup - Division 2
 Champions: 2008

Stats
Steffen Thier's personal statistics in club and international rugby:

Club

 As of 23 December 2010

National team

 As of 6 March 2010

References

External links
 Steffen Thier at scrum.com
   Steffen Thier at totalrugby.de

1980 births
Living people
German rugby union players
Germany international rugby union players
RG Heidelberg players
Rugby union number eights